Lisa Jackson (born 1 June 1979) is an English actress.  Recent roles include Alice Butler in Holby City, Ellie Thomas in Hoff the Record, Portia in Toast of London, Phyllis Stanwyck in Father Brown, Lady Lushingham in Mr Selfridge, Deborah in Panto!, Imogen Moffat in the Channel 4 Comedy Showcase sitcom Campus, Sandra in Mike Bartlett's Love, Love, Love, Janice Pearce in BBC Four's Dirk Gently and Joan Helford in Rupert Goold's production of Time and the Conways at the National Theatre.  Earlier in her career she appeared in Stephen Fry's film Bright Young Things. She trained at LAMDA.

From 6 April to 25 June 2016 she appeared in The Suicide at the National Theatre, starring Javone Prince, directed by Nadia Fall.

Filmography

References

External links

English film actresses
Living people
1979 births
Alumni of the London Academy of Music and Dramatic Art
People educated at Bedales School
English television actresses